The Big Test: The Secret History of the American Meritocracy is a 1999  history book by Nicholas Lemann .

See also
 College
 Universal access

References

1999 non-fiction books
20th-century history books
Farrar, Straus and Giroux books
History books about the United States